Reynardson is a surname. Notable people by that name include:

 Bill Birch Reynardson (1923–2017), barrister involved in the development of marine law
 Abraham Reynardson (1589–1661), English merchant who was Lord Mayor of London
 Henry Thomas Birch Reynardson (1892–1972) British soldier in the Oxfordshire and Buckinghamshire Light Infantry
 Edward Birch Reynardson (1812–1896), British Army officer who served during the Crimean War